The 1909–10 season was Sport Lisboa e Benfica's sixth season in existence and the club's fourth competitive season. Benfica won their first and regional title, the Campeonato de Lisboa.

Campeonato de Lisboa

Table

Matches

Player statistics

|}

References

 

S.L. Benfica seasons
S.L. Benfica season
S.L. Benfica season
1909–10 in Portuguese football